Çatalharman can refer to:

 Çatalharman, Elâzığ
 Çatalharman, Mut